Morningside Club Residence was a historic residential hotel building located at South Bend, St. Joseph County, Indiana. It was built in 1925, and was a four-story, "U"-shaped brick and terra cotta building. A commercial addition to the building was constructed in 1926. It was destroyed by fire on December 18, 1988.

It was listed on the National Register of Historic Places in 1985, and delisted in 1989.

References

Former National Register of Historic Places in Indiana
Hotel buildings on the National Register of Historic Places in Indiana
Hotel buildings completed in 1925
Buildings and structures in St. Joseph County, Indiana
National Register of Historic Places in St. Joseph County, Indiana